John Lomas (27 February 1848 – 16 November 1933) was a New Zealand coalminer, trade unionist and public servant. He was born in Disley, Cheshire, England on 27 February 1848.

References

1848 births
1933 deaths
New Zealand trade unionists
New Zealand coal miners
People from Disley
New Zealand public servants
English emigrants to New Zealand